Yuriy Hruznov (22 February 1947) is a former professional Soviet football goalkeeper and later Soviet and Ukrainian coach.

Coach Career
Beside coaching male teams, Hruznov also was a head coach of the Chernihiv city male team FC Desna Chernihiv and female team WFC Lehenda-ShVSM Chernihiv.

Honours

As Player
FC Khimik Chernihiv
Ukrainian Amateur Football Championship:1976
Chernihiv Oblast Football Championship 1973, 1974, 1975, 1976
Chernihiv Oblast Football Cup 1974, 1975

As Coach
Gomel
Belarusian First League: 1997

References

External links
 
 Yuriy Hruznov: "For the victory everything matters and there ought to be no hiccups (Юрій Грузнов: «Для перемоги все має значення й ніде не повинно бути проколів»). FC Desna Chernihiv. 15 December 2017
 The first steps of Desna in professional football (Перші кроки Десни у професійному футболі). FC Desna Chernihiv. 26 September 2016
 The head of the Chernihiv Oblast Football Veterans Association is 70! (Голові Асоціації ветеранів футболу Чернігівської області — 70 років!). SK news. 21 February 2017.

1947 births
Living people
Footballers from Chernihiv
Soviet footballers
FC Dynamo-2 Kyiv players
FC Desna Chernihiv players
FC Podillya Khmelnytskyi players
Soviet football managers
Ukrainian football managers
Ukrainian expatriate football managers
Expatriate football managers in Belarus
FC Desna Chernihiv managers
FC Khimik Chernihiv players
FC Kryvbas Kryvyi Rih managers
FC Bobruisk managers
FC Gomel managers
WFC Lehenda-ShVSM Chernihiv managers
Association football goalkeepers
Female association football managers